"Bhaja Govindam" (meaning "Praise/Seek Govinda"), also known as "Moha Mudgara" ("Destroyer of illusion"), is a popular Hindu devotional poem in Sanskrit composed by Adi Shankara. This work of Adi Shankara underscores the view that bhakti (devotion) is also important along with jñāna (knowledge), as emphasised by the bhakti movement.

Sanskrit Text
The first stanza of the composition, featuring the eponymous line "Bhaja Govindam", reads as follows:

Story

There is a story related to the composition of this Hymn. It is said that Shri Adi Shankaracharya, accompanied by his disciples, was walking along a street in Varanasi one day when he came across an old aged scholar reciting the rules of Sanskrit grammar of Panini repeatedly on the street. Taking pity on him, Adi Shankara went up to the scholar and advised him not to waste his time on grammar at his age but to turn his mind to God in worship and adoration, which would only save him from this vicious cycle of life and death. The hymn "Bhaja Govindam" is said to have been composed on this occasion.

Significance

This composition is a reminder that Adi Shankaracharya, who is often regarded as reviver of Hinduism Jnana Marga (Jnana Yoga) or the "Path of Knowledge" to attain Mukti, also was a proponent of Bhakti Marga (Bhakti Yoga) to attain the same goal, and as C. Rajagopalachari put in his commentary, "When intelligence (jnana) matures and lodges securely in the heart, it becomes wisdom (vignyana). When that wisdom (vignyana) is integrated with life and issues out in action, it becomes devotion (bhakti).  Knowledge (jnana) which has become mature is spoken of as devotion (bhakti).  If it does not get transformed into devotion (bhakti), such knowledge (jnana) is useless tinsel."

In this prayer, Adi Shankaracharya emphasizes the importance of devotion for God as a means to spiritual development and to liberation from the cycle of birth and death. The prayer leaves one in no doubt that the renunciation of our egotistical differences and surrender to God makes for salvation. Many scholars hold that this composition encapsulates with both brevity and simplicity the substance of all Vedantic thought found in whatever other works that Adi Shankaracharya wrote: 

The refrain "Bhaja Govindam" which defines the composition and gives it its name invokes the almighty in the aspect of supreme god Shree Krishna; it is therefore very popular not only with Sri Adi Shankaracharya's immediate followers, the Smarthas, but also with Vaishnavas and others.

Meter / Chandas
The metre is moraic (मात्राछन्दस्). Apart from the first verse, all other verses have 16 matras, which tend to fit the description of the padakulakam variety of matrasamaka [मात्रासमक] in vrtta-ratnakara.

References

Further reading

 Bhaja Govindam Side by side translation in Hindi and English
 Bhaja Govindam by C. Rajagopalachari (online book)
 Bhaja Govindam by K. P. Rathnakara Bhatta (online book)
 Bhaja Govindam : Follow Your Heart published by Vakils Feffer & Simons Pvt Ltd
Bhaja Govindam – Essence of Vedanta for Peace and Happiness by Br. Prasanna Swaroopa 
 Bhaja Govindam at sanskritdocuments.org
 Bhaja Govindam, by Swami Chinmayananda, Chinmaya Mission, eshop.chinmayamission.com

External links
 Complete Works of Shankaracharya
 Bharatanatyam Rendition of Bhaja Govindam
 Talk by Rajaji at carnatic.com
 Listen to Bhaja Govidam at Raaga
 Bhaja Govindam & its meaning at Kamakoti.org
 An insightful commentary on Bhaja Govindam in a six-episode series by Om Swami.
 

Hindu texts
Sanskrit texts
Bhakti movement
Adi Shankara
Advaita Vedanta texts